K263 or K-263 may refer to:

K-263 (Kansas highway), a former state highway in Kansas
K263, a South Korean armored personnel carrier
K.263 Church Sonata No. 12 in C (1776) by Mozart